Cortland Township is one of nineteen townships in DeKalb County, Illinois, USA. As of the 2010 census, its population was 10,968 and it contained 4,267 housing units. Cortland Township was originally named Richland Township, but was renamed to Pampas Township on November 20, 1850; it was renamed to Cortland Township on February 1, 1865.

Geography

Cities, towns, villages
 Cortland
 Dekalb (east edge)
 Maple Park (partial)
 Sycamore (partial)

Cemeteries
 Mount Rest
 Mount Pleasant
 Ohio Grove

Airports and landing strips
 DeKalb Taylor Municipal Airport
 Ruder Airport

Demographics

School districts
 DeKalb Community Unit School District 428
 Kaneland Community Unit School District 302
 Sycamore Community Unit School District 427

Political districts
 Illinois's 14th congressional district
 State House District 70
 State Senate District 35

References
 
 US Census Bureau 2009 TIGER/Line Shapefiles
 US National Atlas

External links
 City-Data.com
 Illinois State Archives
 Township Officials of Illinois
 DeKalb County Official Site

Townships in DeKalb County, Illinois
1865 establishments in Illinois
Townships in Illinois